Final girl is a trope in horror films.

Final girl or Final Girl may also refer to:

Final Girl (film), a 2015 American film
"Final Girl" (Constantine), an unaired episode of Constantine
"Final Girl" (American Horror Story), an episode of the ninth season of American Horror Story
The Final Girls, a 2015 American comedy slasher film
Final Girls, a 2017 thriller novel

See also
 The Final Girl Support Group, a 2021 horror novel by Grady Hendrix